= Speed limits in Belgium =

Informational sign at the Belgian Borders.

Informational sign at the Flemish borders.

Informational sign at the Walloon borders.

The general speed limits in Belgium are as follows:

- 30 km/h (19 mph) in the entire Brussels-Capital Region, with the exception of certain main axes with dedicated higher speed limitation panels
- 50 km/h (31 mph) within built-up areas;
- 70 km/h (43 mph) outside built-up areas in the Flemish Region and Brussels-Capital Region^{1};
- 90 km/h (56 mph) outside built-up areas in the Wallonia region;
- 120 km/h (75 mph) on roads with at least two two-lane roadways separated by a median, and on freeways.
1. Since 1 January 2017.

The limits shown above apply only if there are no other signs present, as the signs may prescribe a lower or a higher speed limit. The speed limit outside built-up areas in the Flemish region can be restricted to 70 km/h, as well as the posted speed limit outside built-up areas in the Wallonia Region can be 90 km/h. Around almost all schools, 30 km/h (19 mph) zones are found.

Especially in Flanders, the speed limit on roads with at least two two-lane roadways separated by a median is very often reduced to a maximum of 90 km/h (sometimes even to 70 km/h), where they would be 120 km/h without any traffic sign.
